is a town located in Kumage District, Yamaguchi Prefecture, Japan.

Geography

Neighbouring municipalities 

 Yanai
 Kaminoseki
 Tabuse

Transportation 
Hirao did not have any train stations, with the Yanai station being the closest from the town and takes about a ten-minute travel from the town. Japan National Route 188 passes through Hirao.

References

External links

Hirao official website 

Towns in Yamaguchi Prefecture